James Knox Taylor (October 11, 1857 – August 27, 1929) was Supervising Architect of the United States Department of the Treasury from 1897 to 1912. His name is listed ex officio as supervising architect of hundreds of federal buildings built throughout the United States during the period.

Early career
The son of H. Knox and Mary (Young) Taylor, he was born in Knoxville, Illinois, and attended schools in Minnesota. He attended Massachusetts Institute of Technology where he was a classmate of William Martin Aiken, who would precede him in the position of Supervisory Architect, and Cass Gilbert. After graduation, he worked in the New York City office of Charles C. Haight and later with Bruce Price. In 1882 he moved to St. Paul, Minnesota where he formed a partnership with Gilbert, as Gilbert & Taylor. They built many homes and churches. Subsequently, they designed the Pioneer and Endicott Buildings. In 1893 he moved to Philadelphia and formed a partnership with Amos J. Boyden. In 1895 he got a job with Aiken, the Supervisory Architect, as a temporary draftsman. In 1897, following a Civil Service Commission examination,  he became the Supervisory Architect, the first architect promoted from within.

Tarsney Act
In 1893 Missouri Congressman John Charles Tarsney introduced a bill that allowed the Supervisory Architect to hold competitions among private architects for major structures.  Competitions under Taylor's supervision included the Alexander Hamilton U.S. Custom House,  James Farley Post Office, Cleveland Federal Building, U.S. Post Office and Courthouse (Baltimore, Maryland) and U.S. Customhouse (San Francisco, California) (which are all now on the National Register of Historic Places) among others.  The competitions were met with enthusiasm by the community but were also marred by scandal, as when Taylor picked his ex-partner Cass Gilbert for the New York Customs House commission. In 1913 the act was repealed.

In 1912, Taylor returned to MIT for two years as director of the department of architecture, then moved to Yonkers, New York, where for several years he continued practicing. In 1928, he retired to Tampa, Florida, where he died the following year.

Selected works
From 1897 through 1912 Taylor is credited as "supervising architect" for federal buildings constructed during his tenure, a list which includes dozens of post offices, court houses and other structures. Local architects are often credited as well. As the head of a sizable government office, Taylor's direct involvement with any of these projects is open to question.

A partial list of these works include:
Ellis Island Immigrant Hospital, 1908
Pioneer and Endicott Buildings, St. Paul, Minnesota, 1890 (with Cass Gilbert)
Denver Mint, Denver, 1897
United States Post Office (Creston, Iowa), 1901
Philadelphia Mint (Third Building), Philadelphia, 1901
Old Post Office (Buffalo, New York), 1901
United States Post Office (Corning, New York), 1908
Gatke Hall, now part of Willamette University, Salem, Oregon, 1901
United States Courthouse Building and Downtown Postal Station (Tampa, Florida), 1902–1905
Public Safety Building, Cumberland, Maryland, 1904
United States Post Office and Courthouse, Fergus Falls, Minnesota, 1904
United States Post Office, Niagara Falls, New York, 1904
U.S. Post Office and Court House, San Francisco, now the United States Court of Appeals for the Ninth Circuit, 1905
U.S. Post Office (Oil City, Pennsylvania), 1906
U.S. Custom House, Houston 1907–1911
Old Post Office (Albuquerque, New Mexico), 1908
Old Post Office/Museum of Ceramics (East Liverpool, Ohio), 1908
Gainesville, Florida Post Office, 1909
Webster City, Iowa Post Office, 1909
United States Post Office, Courthouse, and Custom House (Spokane, Washington), 1909
U.S. Post Office (Beverly, Massachusetts), 1910
Post Office Building (Greenville, Texas), 1910 
U.S. Post Office and Courthouse (Albany, Georgia), 1910–12
U.S. Post Office (Belvidere, Illinois), 1911
U.S. Post Office (Des Moines, Iowa), 1910
 U. S. Post Office, Waterville, Maine, 1911
United States Post Office (Connellsville, Pennsylvania), 1911–1913
 United States Post Office Mineral Wells, Texas, 1911–1913
Alaska Governor's Mansion, Juneau, Alaska, 1912
United States Post Office (Schenectady, New York), 1912
 United States Post Office (Johnstown, New York), Johnstown, New York, 1912–1913
 United States Post Office (Punxsutawney, Pennsylvania), Punxsutawney, Pennsylvania, 1912–1914
 United States Post Office (Westerly, Rhode Island), Westerly, Rhode Island, 1913-1914
 United States Post Office (Penn Yan, New York), Penn Yan, New York, 1922

References

1857 births
1929 deaths
19th-century American architects
Heads of United States federal agencies
People from Knoxville, Illinois
Architects from Saint Paul, Minnesota
Massachusetts Institute of Technology alumni
Architects from Illinois
United States Department of the Treasury officials
20th-century American architects